Idalus admirabilis is a moth of the family Erebidae. It was described by Pieter Cramer in 1777. It is found in Suriname, Trinidad, Brazil (Amazonas, Santa Catarina), French Guiana and Ecuador.

References

 

admirabilis
Moths described in 1777